The Dictionarium Anglo-Britannicum is a dictionary compiled by philologist John Kersey, which was first published in London in 1708.

It was the third dictionary he had edited, after his 1702 A New English Dictionary and his 1706 revision of Edward Phillips' 1658 dictionary The New World of English Words. The Dictionarium Anglo-Britannicum is essentially an abridged version of this latter dictionary.

References
 Hüllen, Werner, A History of Roget's Thesaurus: Origins, Development and Design (Oxford: Oxford University Press, 2005). . pp. 159–169.

External links
 Scan of the Dictionarium from Google Books

English dictionaries
1708 books